EquityZen is an online marketplace for trading pre-IPO employee shares from privately held companies. The platform often links employees from private companies with investors who would not otherwise be able to invest in the company prior to an IPO. EquityZen is based in Manhattan's Flatiron District.

History
EquityZen was founded in 2013 by Atish Davda (CEO), Shriram Bhashyam, and Phil Haslett in New York City. From its outset, EquityZen was designed to allow employees of private companies to sell their equity in the company to accredited investors. The firm started out as part of the 500 Startups accelerator program in the fall of 2013. The company received seed funding in January 2014 and as of September 2015 had raised Series A funding from undisclosed investors. EquityZen has raised $6.5 million in outside financing, including a $3M injection in 2017 led by Tim Draper's Draper Associates. The financial technology firm was recently mentioned in Forbes' Fintech 50 list.

Service
EquityZen operates a marketplace in which employee shareholders in private companies can make their equity available to outside investors. In addition to traditional share transfers, EquityZen introduced a new offering in the private shares market by working with the issuer to register a transfer of shares so employees and early investors can sell a portion of shares for cash without having to wait until an IPO or acquisition. The firm works exclusively with companies that have already raised capital from large, institutional investors. Companies need to have at least $50 million in enterprise value to be listed on the marketplace. The minimum investment amount for investors is $20,000.

Financial Advisors, who manage capital on behalf of others, invest their clients' capital through the platform. Investors outside of the US have invested in private companies. EquityZen has transacted in over half of the largest 25 private Venture Capital-backed companies, such as prominent companies including Lyft, Evernote, and AppNexus.

References

External links
Official Website

Financial services companies established in 2013
American companies established in 2013
Companies based in Manhattan